Max M. Turshen (March 2, 1906 – December 19, 1980) was an American lawyer and politician from New York.

Life
He was born on March 2, 1906. He attended Public School No. 147 and Boys High School. He graduated from the College of the City of New York and New York University School of Law. He was admitted to the bar in 1928, and practiced law in New York City. He married Rose Lubin (died 1966), and they had three children.

Turshen was a member of the New York State Assembly from 1937 to 1968, sitting in the 160th, 161st, 162nd, 163rd, 164th, 165th, 166th, 167th, 168th, 169th, 170th, 171st, 172nd, 173rd, 174th, 175th, 176th and 177th New York State Legislatures. He was Chairman of the Committee on the Judiciary from 1965 to 1968.

He died on December 19, 1980, in Brookdale Medical Center in Brooklyn

References

1906 births
1980 deaths
Politicians from Brooklyn
Democratic Party members of the New York State Assembly
New York University School of Law alumni
20th-century American politicians
Boys High School (Brooklyn) alumni